Frederik Willem van Eeden (3 April 1860, Haarlem – 16 June 1932, Bussum) was a late 19th-century and early 20th-century Dutch writer and psychiatrist. He was a leading member of the Tachtigers and the Significs Group, and had top billing among the editors of De Nieuwe Gids (The New Guide) during its celebrated first few years of publication, starting in 1885.

Biography 
Van Eeden was the son of Frederik Willem Van Eeden, director of the Royal Tropical Institute in Haarlem.

In 1880 he studied Medicine in Amsterdam, where he pursued a bohemian lifestyle and wrote poetry. Whilst living in the city, he coined the term lucid dream in the sense of mental clarity, a term that nowadays is a classic term in the Dream literature and study, meaning dreaming while knowing that one is dreaming. In his early writings, he was strongly influenced by Hindu ideas of selfhood, by Boehme's mysticism, and by Fechner's panpsychism.

He went on to become a prolific writer, producing many critically acclaimed novels, poetry, plays, and essays. He was widely admired in the Netherlands in his own time for his writings, as well as his status as the first internationally prominent Dutch psychiatrist.

Van Eeden's psychiatrist practice included treating his fellow Tachtiger Willem Kloos as a patient starting in 1888. His treatment of Kloos was of limited benefit, as Kloos deteriorated into alcoholism and increasing symptoms of mental illness. Van Eeden also incorporated his psychiatric insights into his later writings, such as in a deeply psychological novel called "Van de koele meren des doods" (translated in English as "The Deeps of Deliverance"). Published in 1900, the novel intimately traced the struggle of a woman addicted to morphine as she deteriorated physically and mentally.

His best known written work, "De Kleine Johannes" ("Little Johannes"), which first appeared in the premiere issue of De Nieuwe Gids, was a fantastical adventure of an everyman who grows up to face the harsh realities of the world around him and the emptiness of hopes for a better afterlife, but ultimately finding meaning in serving the good of those around him. This ethic is memorialized in the line "Waar de mensheid is, en haar weedom, daar is mijn weg." ("Where mankind is, and her woe, there is my path.")

Van Eeden sought not only to write about, but also to practice, such an ethic. He established a commune named , taking inspiration from Henry David Thoreau's book Walden, in Bussum, North Holland, where the residents tried to produce as much of their needs as they could themselves and to share everything in common, and where he took up a standard of living far below what he was used to. This reflected a trend toward socialism among the Tachtigers; another Tachtiger, Herman Gorter, was a founding member of the world's first Communist political party, the Dutch Social-Democratic Party, in 1909. In 1902 Van Eeden had written an introduction for the first Dutch translation of the book Walden, done by Jeanne Reyneke van Stuwe, the wife of the poet Willem Kloos.

Van Eeden visited the U.S. He had contacts with William James and other psychologists. He met Freud in Vienna, whom he practically introduced in the Netherlands. He corresponded with Hermann Hesse, Charles Lloyd Tuckey (medical hypnotist), Harold Williams (linguist) and was a friend of Peter Kropotkin, the Russian anarchist living in London (UK).book

Van Eeden also had a keen interest in Indian philosophy. He translated many of Tagore’s works, including Gitanjali and short stories.

In late years of his life, Van Eeden became a Roman Catholic.

Works

See also 
 Gerrit Mannoury
 Willem Cornelis Bauer

References 

2 ^ Augustinus P. Dierick: "Self-Stylization and Narrative Strategies in Frederik van Eeden's roman à thèse De nachtbruid." Papers from the Third Interdisciplinary Conference on Netherlandic Studies (ed. Ton J. Broos). Lanham, New York, London: University Press of America, 1988, 45-54.

External links 

 
 
 
 Clan-macrae.org.uk
 A Study of Dreams - Lucidity.com
 The Quest translation of De Kleine Johannes - Word-document

1860 births
1932 deaths
20th-century Dutch novelists
20th-century Dutch male writers
Dutch male novelists
Dutch psychiatrists
People from Bussum
People from Haarlem